The Berkshire, Buckinghamshire and Oxfordshire Wildlife Trust (BBOWT), is a wildlife trust covering the counties of Berkshire, Buckinghamshire and Oxfordshire in England.

The trust was formerly called the Berkshire, Buckinghamshire and Oxfordshire Naturalists' Trust (BBONT).


Sites

Berkshire

Buckinghamshire

Oxfordshire

Notes

References

External links
 Berkshire, Buckinghamshire and Oxfordshire Wildlife Trust website

 
Wildlife Trusts of England